Drive Me Wild is an album by Sawyer Brown.

Drive Me Wild may also refer to:
 "Drive Me Wild" (song), by Sawyer Brown
Drive Me Wild, a romance novel by Vicki Lewis Thompson
"Drive Me Wild", a song by Foo Fighters, 1997
"Drive Me Wild", a song by New Adventures, 1980
"Drive Me Wild", a song by Nona Hendryx, 1987
"Drive Me Wild", a song by Vanity 6, 1982